Son Sang-yeon (born April 2, 2002)  is a South Korean actor. He made his debut as a cast member in the 2016 Tooniverse variety show; Maknae Show 7 and has since starred in other variety shows, television series, web series, films, and a music video. Son established himself as young actor by performing roles as young version of main lead in  Suspicious Partner (2017), Revolutionary Love (2017) and Clean with Passion for Now (2018). He rose to prominence with the 2021 television series Racket Boys as Bang Yoon-dam, for which he was awarded the best new actor award at 2021 SBS Drama Awards. In 2022, he starred Netflix series All of Us Are Dead as Jang Woo-jin.

Early life 
Son is from the Seo district (Seo-gu) of Daejeon where he completed his middle school studies until he and his family moved to Seoul. There, he continued his high school education in the Seoul Baemyeong High School whilst pursuing his acting career.

Career 
Son is affiliated to Awesome ENT artist talent agency. He debuted in 2016 as a cast member of Maknae Show 7 and has taken on numerous guest and support roles in television and web dramas since then. His first main role was in 2019 in the web drama, Triple Fling.

He is known for his main role in Racket Boys as Bang Yoon-dam, captain of his school badminton team. For which, he extensively trained for months as a badminton player along with the other cast members of the series. He was awarded with Best New Actor award at 2021 SBS Drama Awards for his portrayal of Bang Yoon-dam in the series.

Personal life 
Son enlisted in the military training center on November 8, 2021.

Filmography

Films

Television series

Web series

Television shows

Music Video

Awards and nominations

References

External links
 Official website
 

Living people
2002 births
South Korean male child actors
21st-century South Korean male actors
South Korean male television actors
South Korean male film actors
People from Daejeon